Beginning in 2011, Yahoo.com distributed some original programs through its Yahoo! Screen service.

In Spring 2015, Yahoo! began to expand their original programming efforts by producing their first longform scripted series with runtimes between 20 and 30 minutes. These shows included Sin City Saints, Other Space, and the sixth season of the NBC series Community.

On January 4, 2016, following a $42 million write-down in the third quarter of 2015 as a result of the poor performance of its three original series, Yahoo! Screen as a portal was discontinued. Yahoo's original video content was re-located to relevant portals of the site; in particular, its original television series were moved to an "originals" section on the Yahoo! TV site.

Original programming

Drama

Comedy

Continuations

Reality

Live sports

Cancelled original programming

Upon Yahoo! Screen's closure, a number of projects in development by Yahoo! were subsequently cancelled. One of the few series that were previously announced was a comedy series entitled The Pursuit. The show was set to be produced by Scott Stuber and Beth McCarthy-Miller. It would have followed "a group of friends in their late 20s who are living in Manhattan and pursuing success, love, wealth and happiness".

Before the fall 2015 television season, Yahoo! had been in negotiations with 20th Century Fox Television to revive then-recently cancelled comedy series Enlisted for a second season. Yahoo! eventually passed on the revival over budgetary concerns.

References

Yahoo! Screen
Yahoo! Screen
Yahoo!